Agastache foeniculum (syn. Agastache anethiodora (Nutt.) Britton), commonly called anise hyssop, blue giant hyssop, Fragrant giant hyssop, or the lavender giant hyssop, is a species of perennial plant in the mint family, (Lamiaceae).  This plant is native to much of north-central and northern North America, notably the Great Plains and other prairies. It is tolerant of deer and drought, and also attracts hummingbirds, butterflies, bumblebees, honey bees, carpenter bees, and night flying moths.

Anise hyssop is in the same family as hyssop (the mint family Lamiaceae), but they are not closely related. Hyssop (Hyssopus) is a genus of about 10–12 species of herbaceous or semi-woody plants native from the east Mediterranean to central Asia.

Description
The leaves have an oval, toothed shape with a white tint underneath. The plant blooms in June to September with bright lavender flowers that become more colorful near the tip. One plant may produce upwards of 90,000 individual flowers. The root system produces a taproot.

Pollinators

Anise hyssop is considered one of the premier plants for feeding pollinators. The 1969 edition of the Rodale's Encyclopedia of Organic Gardening claims that one acre planted in anise hyssop can support 100 honeybee hives, the flowers blooming for a very long season, often from June until frost and during the time it blooms, one can see bees on the flowers from the morning until dusk. A horticultural writer has claimed that the many flowers of the plant provide forage for bees, butterflies and hummingbirds.

Uses
Anise hyssop was used medicinally by Native Americans for cough, fevers, wounds, diarrhea . The soft, anise-scented leaves are used as a seasoning, as a tea, in potpourri, and can be crumbled in salad. The purple flower spike is favored by bees who make a light fragrant honey from the nectar.

A. foeniculum is sometimes misidentified as A. scrophulariifolia, and in turn A. rugosa is sometimes misidentified as A. foeniculum.

References

foeniculum
Plants used in traditional Native American medicine
Flora of North America
Plants used in Native American cuisine